Peter Makrillos (born 4 September 1995), is an Australian professional footballer who plays as a midfielder for GIF Sundsvall.

Club career
Makrillos spent six years at Stoke City's youth academy and before that spent three months at Barcelona’s famed La Masia. On 24 February 2016, he signed with Rockdale City.

On 11 January 2018, he signed a three-and-a-half-year contract with Greek Super League club Panionios for an undisclosed fee. After only being with the Greek Super League club for a week the Australian youth international featured in their 1–1 draw against Panetolikos.

On 18 February 2022, Makrillos joined Danish 1st Division club FC Fredericia on a deal for the rest of the season. On 30 May 2022, the club confirmed that Makrillos was one out five players who would leave the club, as their contracts expired.

References

External links

1995 births
Living people
Australian people of Greek descent
Australian soccer players
Association football midfielders
Australia under-20 international soccer players
National Premier Leagues players
Super League Greece players
Veikkausliiga players
Danish 1st Division players
Allsvenskan players
FC Barcelona players
Stoke City F.C. players
Newcastle Town F.C. players
Rockdale Ilinden FC players
Sydney Olympic FC players
Panionios F.C. players
IFK Mariehamn players
PFC Slavia Sofia players
FC Fredericia players
GIF Sundsvall players
Australian expatriate soccer players
Australian expatriate sportspeople in Spain
Expatriate footballers in Spain
Australian expatriate sportspeople in England
Expatriate footballers in England
Australian expatriate sportspeople in Finland
Expatriate footballers in Finland
Australian expatriate sportspeople in Bulgaria
Expatriate footballers in Bulgaria
Australian expatriate sportspeople in Denmark
Expatriate men's footballers in Denmark
Australian expatriate sportspeople in Sweden
Expatriate footballers in Sweden